Jeferson Paulo Rodrigues de Souza (born 14 December 1981), known as Mikimba, is a former footballer who played as a right winger. Born and raised in Brazil, he has been naturalized by Togo and played for that national team.

Biography 
Mikimba was born in Joaçaba, a small city situated in the Brazilian state of Santa Catarina. He also hold Togolese citizenship.

International career 
Mikimba made his Togo national team debut on June 8, 2003 in a 2004 African Cup of Nations Qualifying match against Cape Verde, in Lomé. That day Les Eperviers (the nickname of Togo national football team) won 5–2.

International goals

References

External links 

1981 births
Living people
Sportspeople from Santa Catarina (state)
Association football midfielders
Togolese footballers
Togo international footballers
Brazilian footballers
Naturalized citizens of Togo
Associação Chapecoense de Futebol players
Paraná Clube players
Atlético Clube Paranavaí players
Campeonato Brasileiro Série C players
Esporte Clube Águia Negra players
Campeonato Brasileiro Série D players
Nacional Futebol Clube players
Ligue 1 players
FC Metz players
Brazilian expatriate footballers
Brazilian expatriate sportspeople in France
Expatriate footballers in France
21st-century Togolese people